C. utilis  may refer to:
 Calathea utilis, a plant species endemic to Ecuador
 Candida utilis, the torula, a yeast species

See also
 Utilis (disambiguation)